These are the results of the men's C-1 10000 metres competition in canoeing at the 1952 Summer Olympics.  The C-1 event is raced by single-man sprint canoes and took place on July 27.

Medalists

Final
With only ten competitors in the event, a final was held.

After his victory, Havens sent a telegraph to his father Bill, who missed the canoeing events at the 1924 Summer Olympics in Paris to be with his wife during Frank's childbirth. The telegram ended with "I'm coming home with the gold medal you should've won."

Charles W "Bud" Havens, Frank Havens' uncle and Bill Havens Sr's brother, did participate in the canoeing events in 1924 and won 3 Gold medals.

References

1952 Summer Olympics official report. p. 633.
Sports-reference.com 1952 C-1 10000 m results.
Wallechinsky, David and Jamie Loucky (2008). "Canoeing: Men's Discontinued Events". In The Complete Book of the Olympics: 2008 Edition. London: Aurum Press Limited. p. 490.

Men's C-1 10000
Men's events at the 1952 Summer Olympics